MTV's The 70s House is an American reality television show created by Aaron Matthew Lee. The show premiered on MTV on July 5 and ended on September 6, 2005. The show featured twelve contestants participating in a 24/7 simulation of the 1970s. They were required to part with all modern technology including cell phones, laptops, and MP3 players, as well as all modern clothing and lingo, only to adopt their cultural equivalents of the 1970s.

Overview
On each episode contestants were assigned tasks by Oscar, the house's unseen owner who communicated over speakerphone in a parody of Charlie's Angels. Dawn, the show's host, acted as a liaison between the contestants and Oscar and instructed them on how to complete the tasks. After finishing the task Oscar awarded a prize to the contestant (or team) which best completed the task. Two contestants were then chosen, based on that day's performance and how well they otherwise kept their 70s facade. These contestants competed in an elimination challenge at the end of the show and the loser would be eliminated from the show. In the ninth episode, however, three contestants competed in the elimination round and two were eliminated.

Stand-up comedian Natasha Leggero played Dawn, while Bil Dwyer played the elimination challenge host, Bert Van Styles. Guest judges included Erik Estrada, Jimmie Walker and Leif Garrett.

Results

 The contestant won the 70s House
 The contestant won the challenge
 The contestant was awarded immunity and did not compete in the main challenge
 The contestant did not win the challenge, but was awarded safety
 The contestant faced an elimination challenge and won
 The contestant was eliminated from the competition

Episodes

Successor
A similar show centered around 1990s culture called 90's House premiered on MTV in 2017.

References

External links 
 Official Website (via Internet Archive)
 

2005 American television series debuts
2005 American television series endings
2000s American reality television series
English-language television shows
MTV reality television series
Historical reality television series
Television shows set in Los Angeles